Cesar Ruiz (born June 14, 1999) is an American football guard for the New Orleans Saints of the National Football League (NFL). He played college football at Michigan and was drafted by the Saints in the first round of the 2020 NFL Draft.

Early life and high school career
Ruiz was born and grew up in Camden, New Jersey. Ruiz's father, Cesar Edwin Ruiz, was killed when he was struck by a motorist while helping a driver change tires when Cesar was eight years old. He attended Camden High School before transferring to IMG Academy in Bradenton, Florida after his sophomore year. Ruiz was named an Under Armour All-American as a senior in 2017. Rated a four-star recruit and the top center in his class nationally, Ruiz committed to play college football at Michigan over offers from Florida, Auburn, LSU, and several other top-level programs.

College career
Ruiz played in ten games as a freshman, starting five games at right guard and long snapper with his first career start coming against Minnesota. Ruiz started all 13 of Michigan's games at center as a sophomore and was named third-team All-Big Ten Conference by the league's coaches and was an honorable mention selection by the media.

Ruiz was named to the Watchlist for the Rimington Trophy going into his junior season. Ruiz started all 13 of Michigan's games at center, allowing only eight total quarterback pressures in 447 snaps and was named the best pass blocking center in college football by Pro Football Focus, and was named second-team All-Big Ten by the coaches and third-team by the media. Following the end of the season, Ruiz announced that he had decided to forgo his senior season in order to enter the 2020 NFL Draft. Over three seasons, Ruiz played in 36 games for Michigan with 31 games started.

Professional career

Ruiz was drafted by the New Orleans Saints in the first round with the 24th overall pick in the 2020 NFL Draft. Ruiz made his NFL debut on September 21, 2020 on Monday Night Football against the Las Vegas Raiders, playing on six snaps at right guard.

In the 2021 season opening win against the Green Bay Packers, Ruiz started the game at right guard, but played center for rest of the game after Erik McCoy suffered a calf injury in the first quarter. He continued being the team's starting center for the next four games until McCoy returned in Week 7 and Ruiz moved back to right guard.

References

External links
Michigan bio

1999 births
Living people
Players of American football from Camden, New Jersey
American football offensive guards
American football centers
IMG Academy alumni
Michigan Wolverines football players
Under Armour All-American football players
New Orleans Saints players